The South China Sea, or South East Asian Sea, is a marginal sea of the Western Pacific Ocean. It communicates with the East China Sea via the Taiwan Strait, the Philippine Sea via the Luzon Strait, the Sulu Sea via the straits around Palawan (e.g. the Mindoro and Balabac Straits), the Strait of Malacca via the Singapore Strait, and the Java Sea via the Karimata and Bangka Straits. The Gulf of Thailand and the Gulf of Tonkin are also part of South China Sea. The shallow waters south of the Riau Islands are also known as the Natuna Sea.

South China Sea is a region of tremendous economic and geostrategic importance.  One-third of the world's maritime shipping passes through it, carrying over US$3 trillion in trade each year.  Huge oil and natural gas reserves are believed to lie beneath its seabed.  It also contains lucrative fisheries, which are crucial for the food security of millions in Southeast Asia.

The South China Sea Islands, collectively comprising several archipelago clusters of mostly small uninhabited islands, islets (cays and shoals), reefs/atolls and seamounts numbering in the hundreds, are subject to competing claims of sovereignty by several countries. These claims are also reflected in the variety of names used for the islands and the sea.

Names

South China Sea is the dominant term used in English for the sea, and the name in most European languages is equivalent. This name is a result of early European interest in the sea as a route from Europe and South Asia to the trading opportunities of China. In the 16th century, Portuguese sailors called it the China Sea; later needs to differentiate it from nearby bodies of water led to calling it South China Sea. The International Hydrographic Organization refers to the sea as "South China Sea (Nan Hai)".

The Yizhoushu, which was a chronicle of the Western Zhou dynasty (1046–771 BCE), gives the first Chinese name for South China Sea as Nanfang Hai, claiming that barbarians from that sea gave tributes of hawksbill sea turtles to the Zhou rulers. The Classic of Poetry, Zuo Zhuan, and Guoyu classics of the Spring and Autumn period (771–476 BCE) also referred to the sea, but by the name Nan Hai in reference to the State of Chu's expeditions there. Nan Hai, the South Sea, was one of the Four Seas of Chinese literature. There are three other seas, one for each of the four cardinal directions. During the Eastern Han dynasty (23–220 CE), China's rulers called the sea Zhang Hai. Fei Hai became popular during the Southern and Northern Dynasties period. Usage of the current Chinese name, Nan Hai (South Sea), gradually became widespread during the Qing Dynasty.

In Southeast Asia it was once called the Champa Sea or Sea of Cham, after the maritime kingdom of Champa (nowadays Central Vietnam), which flourished there before the sixteenth century. The majority of the sea came under Japanese naval control during World War II following the military acquisition of many surrounding South East Asian territories in 1941. Japan calls the sea  "South China Sea". "West Philippine Sea" is the official designation by the Philippine government of eastern parts of South China Sea that are included in the Philippines' exclusive economic zone. The term is also sometimes incorrectly used to refer to South China Sea as a whole.

In China, it is called the South Sea,, and in Vietnam the East Sea, . In Malaysia, Indonesia and the Philippines, it was long called the South China Sea, with the part within Philippine territorial waters often called the "Luzon Sea", by the Philippines.

However, following an escalation of the Spratly Islands dispute in 2011, various Philippine government agencies started using the name West Philippine Sea. A Philippine Atmospheric, Geophysical and Astronomical Services Administration (PAGASA) spokesperson said that the sea to the east of the Philippines will continue to be called the Philippine Sea. In September 2012, Philippine President Benigno Aquino III signed Administrative Order No. 29, mandating that all government agencies use the name West Philippine Sea to refer to the parts of South China Sea within the Philippines' exclusive economic zone, including the Luzon Sea as well as the waters around, within and adjacent to the Kalayaan Island Group and Bajo de Masinloc, and tasked the National Mapping and Resource Information Authority (NAMRIA) to use the name in official maps.

In July 2017, to assert its sovereignty, Indonesia renamed the northern reaches of its exclusive economic zone in South China Sea as the North Natuna Sea, which is located north of the Indonesian Natuna Islands, bordering southern Vietnam exclusive economic zone, corresponding to southern end of South China Sea. The "Natuna Sea" is located south of Natuna Island within Indonesian territorial waters. Therefore, Indonesia has named two seas that are portions of South China Sea; the Natuna Sea located between Natuna Islands and the Lingga and Tambelan Archipelagos, and the North Natuna Sea located between the Natuna Islands and Cape Cà Mau on the southern tip of the Mekong Delta in Vietnam.

Geography
According to International Hydrographic Organization (IHO) Limits of Oceans and Seas, 3rd edition (1953), it is located.
 east of Vietnam;
 west of the Philippines;
 east of the Malay Peninsula, up to the east entrance of Strait of Singapore, and south of the Bintan and Batam Islands; 
 the northeast coast of Sumatra;
 and north of the Bangka Belitung Islands and Borneo.

However, in its unapproved draft 4th edition (1986), IHO proposed the Natuna Sea, thus South China Sea southern boundary was shifted northward, from north of the Bangka Belitung Islands to north and northeast of Natuna Islands.

States and territories with borders on the sea (clockwise from north) include: the People's Republic of China, the Republic of China (Taiwan), the Philippines, Malaysia, Brunei, Indonesia and Vietnam.

Major rivers that flow into South China Sea include the Pearl, Min, Jiulong, Red, Mekong, Menam, Rajang, Baram, Kapuas, Batang Hari, Musi, Kampar, Indragiri, Pahang, Agno, Pampanga and Pasig Rivers.

Extent
The International Hydrographic Organization in its Limits of Oceans and Seas, 3rd edition (1953), defines the limits of South China Sea as follows:
On the South. The Eastern and Southern limits of Singapore and Malacca Straits [A line joining Tanjong Datok, the Southeast point of Johore through Horsburgh Reef to Pulo Koko, the Northeastern extreme of Bintan Island. The Northeastern coast of Sumatra] as far West as Tanjong Kedabu down the East coast of Sumatra to Lucipara Point thence to Tanjong Nanka, the Southwest extremity of Banka Island (where it transitions as Java Sea), through this island to Tanjong Berikat the Eastern point, on to Tanjong Djemang in Billiton, along the North coast of this island to Tanjong Boeroeng Mandi and thence a line to Tanjong Sambar the Southwest extreme of Borneo.
On the East. From Tanjong Sambar through the West coast of Borneo to Tanjong Sampanmangio, the North point, thence a line to West points of Balabac and Secam Reefs, on to the West point of Bancalan Island and to Cape Buliluyan, the Southwest point of Palawan, through this island to Cabuli Point, the Northern point thereof, thence to the Northwest point of Busuanga and to Cape Calavite in the island of Mindoro, to the Northwest point of Lubang Island and to Point Fuego (14°08'N) in Luzon Island, through this island to Cape Engano, the Northeast point of Luzon, along a line joining this cape with the East point of Balintang Island (20°N) and to the East point of Y'Ami Island (21°05'N) thence to Garan Bi, the Southern point of Taiwan (Formosa), through this island to Santyo (25°N) its North Eastern Point.
On the North. From Fuki Kaku the North point of Formosa to Kiushan Tao (Turnabout Island) on to the South point of Haitan Tao (25°25'N) and thence Westward on the parallel of 25°24' North to the coast of Fukien.
On the West. The Mainland, the Southern limit of the Gulf of Thailand and the East coast of the Malay Peninsula.

However, in a revised edition of Limits of Oceans and Seas, 4th edition (1986), the International Hydrographic Organization officially recognized the Natuna Sea. Thus the southern limit of South China Sea is revised from the Bangka Belitung Islands to the Natuna Islands.

Geology

The sea lies above a drowned continental shelf; during recent ice ages global sea level was hundreds of metres lower, and Borneo was part of the Asian mainland.

The South China Sea opened around 45 million years ago when the "Dangerous Ground" rifted away from southern China. Extension culminated in seafloor spreading around 30 million years ago, a process that propagated to the SW resulting in the V-shaped basin we see today. Extension ceased around 17 million years ago. Arguments have continued about the role of tectonic extrusion in forming the basin. Paul Tapponnier and colleagues have argued that as India collides with Asia it pushes Indochina to the SE. The relative shear between Indochina and China caused the South China Sea to open. This view is disputed by geologists who do not consider Indochina to have moved far relative to mainland Asia. Marine geophysical studies in the Gulf of Tonkin by Peter Clift has shown that the Red River Fault was active and causing basin formation at least by 37 million years ago in the NW South China Sea, consistent with extrusion playing a part in the formation of the sea. Since opening the South China Sea has been the repository of large sediment volumes delivered by the Mekong River, Red River and Pearl River. Several of these deltas are rich in oil and gas deposits.

Islands and seamounts

The South China Sea contains over 250 small islands, atolls, cays, shoals, reefs, and sandbars, most of which have no indigenous people, many of which are naturally under water at high tide, and some of which are permanently submerged. The features are:

 The Spratly Islands
 The Paracel Islands
 Pratas Island and the Vereker Banks
 The Macclesfield Bank
 The Scarborough Shoal

Trade route

The South China Sea is an extremely significant body of water in a geopolitical sense. The sea has historically been an important trade route between China, southeast Asia, and going to India and the west. A number of shipwrecks of trading ships that lie on the ocean's floor attest to a thriving trade going back centuries. Nine historic trade ships carrying ceramics dating back to the 10th century until the 19th century were excavated under Swedish engineer Sten Sjöstrand.

Today it is the second most used sea lane in the world, while in terms of world annual merchant fleet tonnage, over 50% passes through the Strait of Malacca, the Sunda Strait, and the Lombok Strait. Over 1.6 million m³ (10 million barrels) of crude oil a day are shipped through the Strait of Malacca, where there are regular reports of piracy, but much less frequently than before the mid-20th century.

Natural resources
The region has proven oil reserves of around 1.2 km³ (7.7 billion barrels), with an estimate of 4.5 km³ (28 billion barrels) in total. Natural gas reserves are estimated to total around 7,500 km³ (266 trillion cubic feet). A 2013 report by the U.S. Energy Information Administration raised the total estimated oil reserves to 11 billion barrels. In 2014 China began to drill for oil in waters disputed with Vietnam. The area in question is known as Vanguard Bank and which Vietnam officials claim lies within their country's 200-mile exclusive economic zone. China, however, disputes this fact.

According to studies made by the Department of Environment and Natural Resources, Philippines, this body of water holds one third of the entire world's marine biodiversity, thereby making it a very important area for the ecosystem. However the fish stocks in the area are depleted, and countries are using fishing bans as a means of asserting their sovereignty claims.

Indonesia's maritime waters have been breached by fishing fleets from Vietnam and the Philippines leading to said ships being seized and sunk by Indonesian authorities.

China announced in May 2017 a breakthrough for mining methane clathrates, when they extracted methane from hydrates in the South China Sea.

Territorial claims

Several countries have made competing territorial claims over the South China Sea. Such disputes have been regarded as Asia's most potentially dangerous point of conflict.
Both the People's Republic of China (PRC) and the Republic of China (ROC, commonly known as Taiwan) claim almost the entire body as their own, demarcating their claims within what is known as the "nine-dash line", which claims overlap with virtually every other country in the region. Competing claims include:
 Indonesia, Vietnam, China, and Taiwan over waters NE of the Natuna Islands
 The Philippines, China, and Taiwan over Scarborough Shoal.
 Vietnam, China, and Taiwan over waters west of the Spratly Islands. Some or all of the islands themselves are also disputed between Vietnam, China, Taiwan, Brunei, Malaysia, and the Philippines.
 The Paracel Islands are disputed between China, Taiwan and Vietnam.
 Malaysia, Cambodia, Thailand and Vietnam over areas in the Gulf of Thailand.
 Singapore and Malaysia along the Strait of Johore and the Strait of Singapore.

China and Vietnam have both been vigorous in prosecuting their claims. China (various governments) and South Vietnam each controlled part of the Paracel Islands before 1974. A brief conflict in 1974 resulted in 18 Chinese and 53 Vietnamese deaths, and China has controlled the whole of Paracel since then. The Spratly Islands have been the site of a naval clash, in which over 70 Vietnamese sailors were killed just south of Chigua Reef in March 1988. Disputing claimants regularly report clashes between naval vessels.

ASEAN in general, and Malaysia in particular, have been keen to ensure that the territorial disputes within the South China Sea do not escalate into armed conflict. As such, joint development authorities have been set up in areas of overlapping claims to jointly develop the area and divide the profits equally without settling the issue of sovereignty over the area. This is true particularly in the Gulf of Thailand. Generally, China has preferred to resolve competing claims bilaterally, while some ASEAN countries prefer multilateral talks, believing that they are disadvantaged in bilateral negotiations with the much larger China and that because many countries claim the same territory only multilateral talks could effectively resolve the competing claims.

The overlapping claims over Pedra Branca or Pulau Batu Putih including the neighboring Middle Rocks by both Singapore and Malaysia were settled in 2008 by the International Court of Justice, awarding Pedra Branca/Pulau Batu Puteh to Singapore and the Middle Rocks to Malaysia.

In July 2010, US Secretary of State Hillary Clinton called for China to resolve the territorial dispute. China responded by demanding the US keep out of the issue. This came at a time when both countries had been engaging in naval exercises in a show of force to the opposing side, which increased tensions in the region. The US Department of Defense released a statement on August 18 where it opposed the use of force to resolve the dispute, and accused China of assertive behaviour. The spokesperson for the Indian Navy clarified that as no ship or aircraft was visible from INS Airavat it proceeded on her onward journey as scheduled. The Indian Navy further clarified that "[t]here was no confrontation involving the INS Airavat. India supports freedom of navigation in international waters, including in the South China Sea, and the right of passage in accordance with accepted principles of international law. These principles should be respected by all."

In September 2011, shortly after China and Vietnam had signed an agreement seeking to contain a dispute over the South China Sea, India's state-run explorer, Oil and Natural Gas Corporation (ONGC) said that its overseas investment arm ONGC Videsh Limited had signed a three-year deal with PetroVietnam for developing long-term cooperation in the oil sector and that it had accepted Vietnam's offer of exploration in certain specified blocks in the South China Sea. In response, Chinese Foreign Ministry spokesperson Jiang Yu issued a protest. The spokesman of the Ministry of External Affairs of the Government of India responded by saying that "The Chinese had concerns but we are going by what the Vietnamese authorities have told us and have conveyed this to the Chinese." The Indo-Vietnamese deal was also denounced by the Chinese state-run newspaper Global Times.

In 1999, Taiwan claimed the entirety of the South China Sea islands under the Lee Teng-hui administration. The entire subsoil, seabed and waters of the Paracels and Spratlys are claimed by Taiwan.

In 2012 and 2013, Vietnam and Taiwan butted heads against each other over anti-Vietnamese military exercises by Taiwan.
 
In May 2014, China established an oil rig near the Paracel Islands, leading to multiple incidents between Vietnamese and Chinese ships.

In December 2018, retired Chinese admiral Luo Yuan proposed that a possible solution to tensions with the United States in the South China Sea would be to sink one or two United States Navy aircraft carriers to break US morale. Also in December 2018, Chinese commentator and Senior Colonel in the People's Liberation Army Air Force, Dai Xu suggested that China's navy should ram United States Navy ships sailing in the South China Sea.

The US, although not a signatory to UNCLOS, has maintained its position that its naval vessels have consistently sailed unhindered through the South China Sea and will continue to do so. At times US warships have come within the 12 nautical-mile limit of Chinese-controlled islands (such as the Paracel Islands), arousing China's ire. During the US Chief of Naval Operations' visit to China in early 2019, he and his Chinese counterpart worked out rules of engagement, whenever American warships and Chinese warships met up on the high seas.

On 26 June 2020, the 36th Association of Southeast Asian Nations (ASEAN) Summit was held virtually. Vietnam, as the Chairman of the Summit, released the Chairman's Statement. The Statement said the United Nations Convention on the Law of the Sea is "the basis for determining maritime entitlements, sovereign rights, jurisdiction and legitimate interests over maritime zones, and the 1982 UNCLOS sets out the legal framework within which all activities in the oceans and seas must be carried out."

Military maneuver 
It was reported by VOA on 27 August 2020 that a U.S. defense official said that the People's Liberation Army of China launched four medium-range ballistic missiles from mainland China into an area of the South China Sea.

In 2022, Vietnam demanded that Taiwan stop conducting its military drills at the Spratly Islands, which is located within the South China Sea.

2016 arbitration

In January 2013, the Philippines initiated arbitration proceedings against China (PRC) over issues surrounding the nine-dash line, characterization of maritime features, and EEZ. On 12 July 2016, an arbitral tribunal ruled in favor of the Philippines on most of its submissions. It clarified that it would not "rule on any question of sovereignty over land territory and would not delimit any maritime boundary between the Parties" but concluded that China had not historically exercised exclusive control within the nine-dash line, hence has "no legal basis" to claim "historic rights" over the resources. It also concluded that China's historic rights claims over the maritime areas (as opposed to land masses and territorial waters) inside the nine-dash line would have no lawful effect outside of what's entitled to under UNCLOS. It criticized China's land reclamation projects and its construction of artificial islands in the Spratly Islands, saying that it had caused "severe harm to the coral reef environment". Finally, it characterized Taiping Island and other features of the Spratly Islands as "rocks" under UNCLOS, and therefore are not entitled to a 200 nautical mile exclusive economic zone. The arbitral tribunal decision was ruled as final and non-appealable by either country. China rejected the ruling, calling it "ill-founded". Taiwan, which currently administers Taiping Island, the largest of the Spratly Islands, also rejected the ruling. Eight governments have publicly called for the ruling to be respected, 35 have issued generally positive statements noting the verdict but have stopped short of calling for the parties to abide by it, and eight have publicly rejected it. The eight governments in support are Australia, Canada, Germany, Japan, New Zealand, the Philippines, United Kingdom, and the United States; the governments in opposition are China, Montenegro, Pakistan, Russia, Sudan, Syria, Taiwan, and Vanuatu. The United Nations itself doesn't have a position on the legal and procedural merits of the case or on the disputed claims, and the Secretary-General expressed his hope that the continued consultations on a Code of Conduct between ASEAN and China under the framework of the Declaration of the Conduct of Parties in the South China Sea will lead to increased mutual understanding among all the parties.

In March 2020, the Philippines expressed its concern about approximately 220 PRC militia vessels in the disputed area.

See also

 
 List of maritime features in the Spratly Islands
 South China Sea Islands
 Spratly Islands
 Spratly Islands dispute
 Territorial disputes in the South China Sea

References

Further reading
 
 Francois-Xavier Bonnet, Geopolitics of Scarborough Shoal, Irasec Discussion Paper 14, November 2012 
 C. Michael Hogan (2011) South China Sea Topic ed. P. Saundry. Ed.-in-chief C.J. Cleveland. Encyclopedia of Earth. National Council for Science and the Environment. Washington DC
 Clive Schofield et al., From Disputed Waters to Seas of Opportunity: Overcoming Barriers to Maritime Cooperation in East and Southeast Asia (July 2011)
 UNEP (2007). Review of the Legal Aspects of Environmental Management in the South China Sea and Gulf of Thailand. UNEP/GEF/SCS Technical Publication No. 9.
 Wang, Gungwu (2003). The Nanhai Trade: Early Chinese Trade in the South China Sea. Marshall Cavendish International. .
 Keyan Zou (2005). Law of the sea in East Asia: issues and prospects. London/New York: Rutledge Curzon. 
 United States. Congress. (2014). Maritime Sovereignty in the East and South China Seas: Joint Hearing before the Subcommittee on Seapower and Projection Forces of the Committee on Armed Services Meeting Jointly with the Subcommittee on Asia and the Pacific of the Committee on Foreign Affairs (Serial No. 113-137), House of Representatives, One Hundred Thirteenth Congress, Second Session, Hearing held January 14, 2014

External links

 ASEAN and the South China Sea: Deepening Divisions Q&A with Ian J. Storey (July 2012)
 Rising Tensions in the South China Sea, June 2011 Q&A with Ian J. Storey
 News collections on The South China Sea on China Digital Times
 The South China Sea on Google Earth - featured on Google Earth's Official Blog
 South China Sea Virtual Library - online resource for students, scholars and policy-makers interested in South China Sea regional development, environment, and security issues.
 Energy Information Administration - The South China Sea
 Tropical Research and Conservation Centre - The South China Sea
 Weekly Piracy Report 
 Reversing Environmental Degradation Trends in the South China Sea and Gulf of Thailand
 UNEP/GEF South China Sea Knowledge Documents
 Audio Radio communication between United States Navy Boeing P-8A Poseidon aircraft operating under international law and the Chinese Navy warnings.
 A 1775 Chart of the China Sea | Southeast Asia Digital Library

 
Marginal seas of the Pacific Ocean
Maritime Southeast Asia
Seas of Indonesia
Seas of Malaysia
Seas of the Philippines
Bodies of water of Brunei
Seas of China
Bodies of water of Hong Kong
Bodies of water of Macau
Bodies of water of Singapore
Seas of Taiwan
Bodies of water of Vietnam
Disputed territories in Southeast Asia
Territorial disputes of China
Territorial disputes of Malaysia
Territorial disputes of Vietnam
Territorial disputes of the Philippines
Territorial disputes of the Republic of China
Indonesia–Vietnam border
Malaysia–Vietnam border
Seas of Asia
China Seas